Kunstreligion is a term used around the turn of the nineteenth century to refer to Art-as-religion, specifically music, but also used to refer to any art that was sacralized.

References 

Visual arts theory
Philosophy of music
Concepts in aesthetics